Karen Harris may refer to:

 Karen Harris (model), American model for Estee Lauder, Inc.
 Karen Harris (writer), American television writer
 Karen R. Harris, educational psychologist and special educator